Caia van Maasakker (born 5 April 1989) is a Dutch field hockey player.

At the 2012 Summer Olympics, she competed for the Netherlands women's national field hockey team in the women's event winning a gold medal.  She was part of the Netherlands's silver medal winning side at the 2016 Olympics.

References

External links 
 

1989 births
Living people
Dutch female field hockey players
Field hockey players at the 2012 Summer Olympics
Medalists at the 2012 Summer Olympics
Olympic field hockey players of the Netherlands
Olympic gold medalists for the Netherlands
Olympic medalists in field hockey
Field hockey players from The Hague
Field hockey players at the 2016 Summer Olympics
Field hockey players at the 2020 Summer Olympics
Medalists at the 2016 Summer Olympics
Olympic silver medalists for the Netherlands
Female field hockey defenders
SCHC players
Medalists at the 2020 Summer Olympics
20th-century Dutch women
21st-century Dutch women